Akhara is a village in the Tehsil Jagraon, Ludhiana, Punjab, India.

Demographics 
According to the 2001 Census, Akhara has a population of 5,900 people. Akhara was incorporated as a village, but due to population growth the size of the village is approaching that of a small town.

History 
Akhara can trace its beginning in the 17th century. It was brought into limelight by Baba Sahib Singh Singh Bedi.

Akhara has a significant number of families with the "Brar", "Samra", "Gill", "Baryar" and
a few others like "saran", "Kaler", "Sidhu", "Samra (clan)", "Bhanot", "Saggu", "Sambhi", "Lohat", "Nahar", "Gharu", "Kanda", "Sekhon", "Bedi","Batish", Mattu" surnames.

Location 
Akhara lies on the Jagraon-Hathur road and situated at about 8 km from Jagraon.  The nearest railway station to Akhara is Jagraon railway station at a distance of 6.5 km.
Neighbouring villages include Roomi, Dholan, Kaonke Kalan, Bhamipura, Dalla, Bir Akhara and Kothe Premsar.

Transport 
The nearest station to Akhara is Jagraon Railway Station, situated on the main line between Ludhiana and Ferozpur.
Regular state government owned Punjab Roadways (Jagraon Depot), Pepsu Transport (PRTC) and private bus services operate between Jagraon - Hathur, Jagraon - Barnala, Jagraon - Sangrur, Jagraon - Bilaspur through this village (Akhara). Also three wheeler Tempo service operate between Jagraon and Manuke through Akhara.
For a personal service, a SUV, minivan or car taxi service can be hired from the Jagraon.

The nearest international airport is Amritsar about 120 km away, other international airport is in New Delhi situated at 350 km . Other airports are Sahnewal Airport near Ludhiana and a military air base is at Halwara, about 15 km from Akhara.

Youth Services Club, Akhara and Baba Sahib Singh Bedi Sports Club 
Youthy Services Club (Regd.) and Baba Sahib Singh Bedi Sports Club are social organizations working towards a better & educated healthy society. Their aim is to improve literacy, eradicate poverty, abolish child labour, uplift and instill confidence among the weaker sections of the society. These NGO's focus on assessing individual strengths and needs, setting personal goals and encouraging young talent towards education, cultural activities, sports and games by providing an conducive environment that encourages growth and development. Gurpreet Singh is the chairman of the NGO.

Education 
There are three schools located in the village- Govt Primary School, Akhara and Govt Secondary School, Akhara and The Unirise World School

Other Institutions 
 Union Bank, Akhara,
 Co-operative Agriculture Society

References 

 http://ifsc.india-banks-info.com/union-bank-of-india-ifsc-codes/punjab/ludhiana/
 http://www.tribuneindia.com/2013/20131011/ldh1.htm
 http://www.tribuneindia.com/2008/20081207/ldh1.htm

External links 
 
 

 
Villages in Ludhiana district